Barret Rex Peery (born April 3, 1971) is an American college basketball coach and current assistant coach at UNLV. He was formerly the head coach at Portland State.

Playing career
Peery played college basketball at Snow College for two seasons before transferring to Southern Utah, where he was a part of two American West Conference championship squads.

Coaching career
After graduation, Peery assisted at Southern Utah for one season before returning to Snow College for another season as an assistant coach. After a stop at Utah Valley, Peery returned as an assistant at Southern Utah before taking an assistant coaching position at Portland State from 2002 to 2003. Peery then served as an assistant coach at College of Southern Idaho from 2003 to 2005 under Gib Arnold, before taking over as the head coach from 2005 to 2008. In that time, Peery compiled an 85-19 record and was a two-time NJCAA Region 18 Coach of the Year, while also making the NCJAA National Tournament semifinals during the 2006–07 season. In 2008, Peery moved back to the NCAA Division I ranks to join Jim Boylen's staff at Utah where he stayed until 2011, before heading to Indian Hills Community College as head coach, and led them to a 93-11 record in three seasons. Peery joined Herb Sendek's staff at Arizona State in 2014, and rejoined Sendek again at Santa Clara before being named the head coach at Portland State.

Head coaching record

NJCAA

NCAA D1

References

1971 births
Living people
American men's basketball coaches
American men's basketball players
Arizona State Sun Devils men's basketball coaches
Basketball coaches from Utah
Basketball players from Utah
Junior college men's basketball players in the United States
Portland State Vikings men's basketball coaches
Santa Clara Broncos men's basketball coaches
Snow College alumni
Southern Idaho Golden Eagles men's basketball coaches
Southern Utah Thunderbirds men's basketball coaches
Southern Utah Thunderbirds men's basketball players
Utah Utes men's basketball coaches